Eilema calamaria is a moth of the subfamily Arctiinae first described by Frederic Moore in 1878. It is found in the north-western Himalayas.

References

Moths described in 1878
calamaria